Thomas Forster  (April 1894 – 6 February 1955) was an English footballer. His regular position was at full back. He was born in Northwich, Cheshire. He played for Manchester United and Northwich Victoria.

External links
MUFCInfo.com profile

1894 births
1955 deaths
English footballers
Manchester United F.C. players
Northwich Victoria F.C. players
Sportspeople from Northwich
Association football fullbacks